Stevinson is an unincorporated community and census-designated place in Merced County, California. The population was 275 at the 2020 census, down from 313 at the 2010 census.

The Stevinson post office opened in 1907. The name honors James J. Stevinson, who bought land nearby in 1852.

The town is noted for its bullring, where Portuguese bullfighting is staged regularly. It is one of several bullrings maintained by the Portuguese-American community throughout California's Central Valley.

The US Army built the Howard Auxiliary Field (1942-1944) to train World War II pilots in 
Stevinson.

Geography
Stevinson is in northwestern Merced County, north of the intersection of State Routes 140 and 165. SR 140 leads east  to Merced, the county seat, and southwest  to Gustine, while SR 165 leads north  to Turlock and south  to Los Banos.

Climate
This region experiences warm (but not hot) and dry summers, with no average monthly temperatures above .  According to the Köppen Climate Classification system, Stevinson has a warm-summer Mediterranean climate, abbreviated "Csb" on climate maps.

Demographics
The 2010 United States Census reported that Stevinson had a population of 313. The racial makeup of Stevinson was 228 (72.8%) White, 4 (1.3%) African American, 0 (0.0%) Native American, 0 (0.0%) Asian, 0 (0.0%) Pacific Islander, 73 (23.3%) from other races, and 8 (2.6%) from two or more races. Hispanic or Latino of any race were 133 persons (42.5%).

The Census reported that 313 people (100% of the population) lived in households, 0 (0%) lived in non-institutionalized group quarters, and 0 (0%) were institutionalized.

There were 92 households, out of which 42 (45.7%) had children under the age of 18 living in them, 49 (53.3%) were opposite-sex married couples living together, 5 (5.4%) had a female householder with no husband present, 9 (9.8%) had a male householder with no wife present.  There were 11 (12.0%) unmarried opposite-sex partnerships, and 0 (0%) same-sex married couples or partnerships. 19 households (20.7%) were made up of individuals, and 2 (2.2%) had someone living alone who was 65 years of age or older. The average household size was 3.40.  There were 63 families (68.5% of all households); the average family size was 4.11.

The population was spread out, with 95 people (30.4%) under the age of 18, 37 people (11.8%) aged 18 to 24, 82 people (26.2%) aged 25 to 44, 73 people (23.3%) aged 45 to 64, and 26 people (8.3%) who were 65 years of age or older.  The median age was 28.9 years. For every 100 females, there were 118.9 males.  For every 100 females age 18 and over, there were 124.7 males.

The homeowner vacancy rate was 0%; the rental vacancy rate was 4.8%.  168 people (53.7% of the population) lived in owner-occupied housing units and 145 people (46.3%) lived in rental housing units.

References

Census-designated places in Merced County, California
Census-designated places in California